= Gulchēhra Sulaymānī =

Tajik poet & writer (1928–2003)

Gulchihra Sulaymonova (Tajik: Гулчеҳра Сулаймонӣ; 1 January 1928 – 5 April 2003) was a Tajik poet.

== Biography ==
Sulaymonova was a native of Bukhara, where she was born into the family of Otojon Sulaymonov. In 1947, she graduated from the Bukhara Pedagogical Institute, and for a time taught at middle schools in the city. In 1948, she moved to Dushanbe to teach language and literature at the Pedagogical School there. She then moved into the field of publishing, working at varying management levels at the state publishing house. As a writer, Sulaymonova was best known for her work for children; she is considered the foremost Tajik poet to have written for them. Her work was first published in 1946. Selected publications include: Today is the New Year (1957); Two Cherry Trees (1962); Primrose (1966); The Apple of the Fair (1974); A String of Corals (1975); and The Days of Tulip Flowers (1982). She joined the Union of Soviet Writers in 1957. Among the awards which she received for her poetry were the Honorary Order of the Presidium of the Supreme Soviet of Tajikistan and a number of medals, including the Order of Friendship of Peoples, as well as the Rudaki State Prize from the government of the Tajik SSR, in 1976; she was also named National Poet of Tajikistan for her work. Sulaymonova died of heart disease.
